= Washburn Lake (Portage County, Wisconsin) =

Lake in the state of Wisconsin, United States

- Location within Wisconsin Location within the United States
- Location: Portage County, Wisconsin
- Coordinates: 44°15′22″N 89°27′05″W
- Type: lake
- Surface elevation: 1,099 feet (335 m)

Washburn Lake is a lake in the U.S. state of Wisconsin.

Washburn Lake was named after the local Washburn family.
